Atlantis (born September 28, 1962) is a Mexican luchador enmascarado (masked professional wrestler), working for Consejo Mundial de Lucha Libre (CMLL) where he performs as a Técnico (face or "good guy" character) and is one of the longest-tenured luchador in CMLL history. Atlantis was trained by Diablo Velasco, made his in-ring debut in 1983 and has always wrestled under the ring name Atlantis, named after the sunken city of Atlantis. Atlantis has held a large number of professional wrestling championships over the years, both in Mexico and in Japan, both individually and as a tag team. He has also won the mask of several prominent wrestlers through his career including Kung Fu, Villano III, Último Guerrero and La Sombra.

Atlantis earned the nickname El idolo de los Niños (the children's idol) as he was always a favorite with the younger fans. He even retained the nickname when he worked as a Rudo (a wrestler who portrays the bad guy) for several years. Atlantis' real name is not a matter of public record, as is often the case with masked wrestlers in Mexico where their private lives are kept a secret from the wrestling fans. In the 1990s Atlantis starred in a couple of Lucha films, including one where he teamed up with Octagón called Octagón y Atlantis, la revancha ("Octagón and Atlantis, the rematch").

Professional wrestling career

Atlantis made his professional wrestling debut on June 12, 1983, after training under world-renowned Mexican wrestling trainer Diablo Velazco for just under a year. He adopted the masked ring persona of "Atlantis", a supposed warrior from the lost city of Atlantis, complete with a mask that had the image of two fish on it. After working for various Mexican promotions for the first year of his career Atlantis became a regular for Empresa Mexicana de Lucha Libre (EMLL), Mexico's oldest professional wrestling promotion. On November 30, 1984, Atlantis defeated Jerry Estrada to win the Mexican National Middleweight Championship, the first wrestling title of his career. Atlantis held the Middleweight title for 457 days, with several high-profile title defenses that helped establish the young wrestler's reputation for good matches. On March 2, 1986 Atlantis lost the Middleweight title to Talismán. By 1988 Atlantis had formed a regular tag team with Ángel Azteca and on March 6, 1988, the duo defeated Los Infernales (Masakre and MS-1 to win the Mexican National Tag Team Championship. Three months later Atlantis became a double champion when he defeated Kung Fu to win the NWA World Middleweight Championship, the highest championship in the middleweight division. Atlantis only held the title for 37 days before losing it to Emilio Charles Jr. in his first defense. He quickly regained the title, defeating Charles Jr. on July 20, 1988, and held it for two weeks before losing the title back to Emilio Charles Jr. On May 25, 1990, after an 811-day reign, Atlantis and Ángel Azteca lost the Mexican Nation Tag Team Championship to Pierroth Jr. and Bestia Salvaje. The loss of the title was used as a storyline motivation for Ángel Azteca turning Rudo (villain or heel) by attacking Atlantis. The feud between the two continued off and on over the years until Ángel Azteca's death in 2007. The two fought in several intense and bloody battles, but remained close friends backstage.

The feud with Ángel Azteca, coupled with a third run with the NWA World Middleweight title made Atlantis one of the rising stars in EMLL, and he was one of the key figures in the "rebranding" of the company to Consejo Mundial de Lucha Libre (CMLL) in 1990. In 1991 Atlantis starred in a movie called La Fuerza Bruta ("The Brute Power") and soon after began filming another movie where he teamed up with Octagón called Octagón y Atlantis, la revancha ("Octagón and Atlantis, the revenge") that opened in 1992. On April 4, 1991, Atlantis, Octagón, and Máscara Sagrada, a team nicknamed "Los Movie Stars" defeated Los Thundercats (Leono, Panthro, and Tigro, a team of masked wrestlers patterned on the Thundercats cartoon) to win the Mexican National Trios Championship. The trio held the title for 94 days before losing it to Los Hermanos Dinamita (Cien Caras, Máscara Año 2000 and Universo 2000) on August 11, 1991. Not long after the title loss Octagón and Máscara Sagrada left CMLL for the recently formed Asistencia Asesoría y Administración (AAA) promotion, jumping ship before the "Atlantis y Octagón" movie opened in the theaters. Atlantis was also offered a contract by AAA but decided to stay with the company he ended up working for almost his entire career. On March 3, 1993, Atlantis lost the NWA World Middleweight title to Mano Negra, as part of a long-running storyline between the two. While Mano Negra won the championship, Atlantis gained the ultimate measure of revenge as he unmasked Mano Negro by defeating him in a Lucha de Apuesta (bet match) as the main event of CMLL's 60th Anniversary Show. On March 2, 1994, Atlantis defeated Dr. Wagner Jr. to win the CMLL World Light Heavyweight Championship, officially moving from the Middleweight to the Light Heavyweight division, a title he would hold for 655 days. In 1995 Atlantis brother made his wrestling debut as Atlantico and the two teamed up on a regular basis, including second annual Gran Alternativa tournament, losing to Dr. Wagner Jr. and Astro Rey Jr. in the second round. On November 3, 1995, Atlantis teamed with Rayo de Jalisco Jr. to win the CMLL World Tag Team Championship from The Headhunters. The team lost the tag team title in August 1996 but Atlantis and new partner Lizmark won the titles back from La Ola Blanca (Spanish for "the White Wave"; Gran Markus Jr. and El Hijo del Gladiador). Atlantis and Lizmark only held the title for 12 days before the titles were vacated following an inconclusive match with the Headhunters. Atlantis and Lizmark continued to team and were joined by Mr. Niebla in 1997 to form La Ola Azur ("The Blue Wave"), a reference to the fact that all three wrestlers mainly wore blue. La Ola Azul won the CMLL World Trios Championship from Rey Bucanero, Emilio Charles Jr. and El Satánico. La Ola Azur defended the title for over 500 days until October 1998 where an injury to Mr. Niebla forced the team to give up the title. On May 10, 1990, Atlantis defeated Dr. Wagner Jr. to become only the second man to ever hold the CMLL World Light Heavyweight Championship two times. Over the next 196 days Atlantis' CMLL World Light Heavyweight title defenses headlined several shows in Mexico City before he lost the title to Villano III on November 22, 1999. The title change was just one of the highlights of a long-running feud between Atlantis and Villano III, a feud that also included III's younger brothers Villano IV and Villano V. On March 17, 2000, at CMLL's Juicio Final event, Atlantis won his biggest Apuesta victory to date as he defeated and then unmasked Villano III in a match that was voted the Wrestling Observer 2000 Match of the Year. On June 16, 2002, Atlantis, Mr. Niebla, and Black Warrior defeated Blue Panther, Fuerza Guerrera and Dr. Wagner Jr. to win the CMLL World Trios title, a title the team held for 278 days. In 2003 Atlantis travelled to Japan, working for Michinoku Pro where he won the Tohoku Junior Heavyweight Championship from Dick Togo on August 26, 2003. Atlantis' tour of Michinoku Pro was so well received that he was allowed to retain the title when travelling back to Mexico and has been invited on annual tours with the promotion every year since then. On March 28, 2004, Atlantis lost the Michinoku Pro title to The Great Sasuke, returning the belt to Japan. On June 25 Atlantis teamed up with Blue Panther to defeat Los Guerreros del Infierno ("The Warriors of Hell"; Último Guerrero and Rey Bucanero) to win the CMLL World Tag Team Title. Their title reign lasted 280 days until Atlantis turned on his partner during a match and cost them the titles. The fact that the career tecnico (face or "good guy" character) turned rudo for the first time helped revitalize a career that was stagnating.

Los Guerreros de la Atlantida

The Rudo Atlantis joined up with Los Guerreros del Infierno, renaming the group Los Guerreros de la Atlantida (The Warriors of the Atlantis) out of respect for their new co-leader. Shortly after his turn Atlantis won the 2005 International Gran Prix by eliminating Rey Bucanero and Perro Aguayo Jr. to be the only survivor in the match. Soon after he defeated Dr. Wagner Jr. to win the NWA World Light Heavyweight Championship. 2005 turned out to be Atlantis' strongest and most successful year as he also won that year's Leyenda de Plata tournament, as well as teaming up with La Máscara to win the 2005 Gran Alternativa. On September 29, 2009, Los Guerrero de la Atlantida won the vacant CMLL World Trios Championship by defeating Perro Aguayo Jr., Héctor Garza and Shocker in a tournament final. On November 2, 2009, Atlantis won his fourth CMLL World Tag Team title, this time teaming with Último Guerrero to defeat Místico and Negro Casas for the championship. The team lost the Tag Team championship to Averno and Mephisto on February 1, 2008. Atlantis, Último Guerrero and Negro Casas (collectively nicknamed Los Guerreros Negros, the Black Warriors) won the CMLL world Trios Title and held it for 166 days, before losing it on January 1, 2009, to El Hijo del Fantasma Héctor Garza and La Máscara. On April 5, 2009, Atlantis lost the NWA World Light Heavyweight Championship to El Texano Jr. in the main event of a show in Guadalajara, Jalisco, Mexico ending Atlantis' reign after 988 days. In late 2009 it was rumored that Los Guerreros de la Atlantida had split up, but when Atlantis and Último Guerrero teamed up on CMLL's Sin Salida show the rumors turned out to not be true.

On January 22, 2010, Atlantis teamed up with Máscara Dorada to participate in CMLL's Torneo Nacional de Parejas Increibles("National Amazing Pairs tournament"), a tournament where CMLL teams up a Tecnico (Dorada) and a Rudo (Atlantis) for a tournament. The two defeated Dragón Rojo Jr. and La Sombra in the opening round, Mr. Niebla and Máximo in the second round and Místico and Averno in the semi-final to earn a spot in the final of the tournament. During the tournament Atlantis wore his old Tecnico white mask, acting and wrestling a tecnico style. On February 5, 2010 Atlantis and Dorada defeated Negro Casas and La Máscara in the finals to win the tournament. On July 12, 2010, at the Promociones Gutiérrez 1st Anniversary Show Atlantis participated in a match where 10 men put their mask on the line in a match that featured five parejas increibles teams, with the losing team being forced to wrestle each other with their mask on the line. His partner in the match was Olímpico, facing off against the teams of Místico and El Oriental, La Sombra and Histeria, El Alebrije and Volador Jr., and Último Guerrero and Averno. Olímpico and Atlantis was the last team that escaped the match, leaving El Oriental and Místico to wrestle for their masks, which ended with Místico defeating El Oriental. After teaming up and working well together during the Ruleta de la Muerte tournament Olímpico, Atlantis and Último Guerrero teamed up more frequently. During a trios tournament on the August 13 Super Viernes Olímpico caused his team to be disqualified and then attacked his former teammates, ending their tentative relationship. As a result of his actions after the match Olímpico, Último Guerrero and Atlantis were all added to the main event of the CMLL 77th Anniversary Show, a 14-man steel cage Lucha de Apuestass, mask vs. mask match. In May 2010 Rayo de Jalisco Jr. returned to CMLL after not having worked for the promotion for five years. During one of his first interviews back with CMLL he commented that it was strange to see his former friend and tag team partner Atlantis as a rudo. The seemingly unrelated comment slowly build into a storyline between the two former partners, initially facing off on opposite sides of trios matches. During the build of the match Atlantis has expressed an interest in challenging Rayo de Jalisco Jr. for his WWA World Heavyweight Championship, but also stated that it was too early to talk about a Lucha de Apuestas, mask vs. mask match, between the two as they had not even faced off in a one on one match yet. Atlantis was the ninth man to leave the steel cage match at the 77th Anniversary, keeping his mask safe. The match came down to La Sombra pinning Olímpico to unmask him. On November 2, Atlantis was scheduled to challenge for the CMLL World Tag Team Championship alongside Último Guerrero, but could not take part in the match due to an injury and was replaced by Dragón Rojo Jr. In the end Guerrero and Rojo Jr. went on to win the titles, after which Rojo Jr. was made an official member of Los Guerreros de la Atlantida. On February 25, 2011, Atlantis and Máscara Dorada defeated Blue Panther and Dragón Rojo Jr. in the finals to win the Torneo Nacional de Parejas Increíbles for the second year in a row. In June, Atlantis replaced an injured Shocker and teamed with Delta and Guerrero Maya Jr. in the Forjando un Ídolo tournament, which they eventually went on to win. On July 31, 2011, Atlantis and Rey Bucanero made an unadvertised appearance for American promotion Chikara, losing to F.I.S.T. (Chuck Taylor and Johnny Gargano) via disqualification, when Gargano faked taking a low blow from Atlantis. After weeks of tension between Atlantis and Último Guerrero, CMLL held a press conference on August 11, where Atlantis officially turned technico and left Los Guerreros de la Atlantida.

Los Reyes de la Atlantida
Atlantis and Último Guerrero faced each other in a big grudge match on September 23, which saw Atlantis pick up the win. On November 16, Atlantis announced that he was officially forming a stable named Los Reyes de la Atlantida ("The Kings of the Atlantis") with Delta and Guerrero Maya Jr. On December 16, the trio defeated Los Invasores (Olímpico, Psicosis and Volador Jr.) for the Mexican National Trios Championship at CMLLL's Sin Piead show. On March 2, 2012, at Homenaje a Dos Leyendas, Atlantis won his third National Parejas Increibles tournament in a row, this time teaming with Mr. Niebla. On June 22, Los Reyes de la Atlantida lost the Mexican National Trios Championship to Los Depredadores del Aire (Black Warrior, Mr. Águila and Volador Jr.). On the August 3 Super Viernes show, Atlantis and Diamante Azul defeated Dragón Rojo Jr. and Último Guerrero to win the CMLL World Tag Team Championship. On October 30, Los Reyes de la Atlantida regained the Mexican National Trios Championship from Los Depredadores del Aire. On November 13, 2012 Atlantis and Demonio Azul lost their tag team championship to El Terrible and Tama Tonga. On December 16, Los Reyes de la Atlantida lost the Mexican National Trios Championship to the Los Invasores team of Kraneo, Mr. Águila and Psicosis II.

In January 2013, Atlantis returned to Japan, when he, as a late replacement for an injured Místico II, took part in the three-day Fantastica Mania 2013 event, co-promoted by CMLL and New Japan Pro-Wrestling in Tokyo. During the first night on January 18, he teamed with Jushin Thunder Liger and Tiger Mask in a six-man tag team match, where they were defeated by Gedo, Jado and Mephisto. The following night, Atlantis defeated Euforia in a singles match. During the third and final night, Atlantis teamed with IWGP Heavyweight Champion Hiroshi Tanahashi and IWGP Junior Heavyweight Champion Prince Devitt to defeat Euforia, Kazuchika Okada and Mephisto in a six-man tag team main event. In early 2013 the long-running feud between Atlantis and Último Guerrero came to the forefront of CMLL booking once more. The two were booked for the 2013 Torneo Nacional de Parejas Increibles tournament, forcing the two rivals to team up. Before their qualifying round both Atlantis and Gurrero stated that they would put their differences aside for the sake of the tournament. Atlantis and Guerrero displayed the teamwork they had developed by being partners in Los Guerreros de la Atlantida for several years as they defeated the teams of Valiente and Pólvora, Diamante Azul and Euforia and finally Dragón Rojo Jr. and Niebla Roja to qualify for the finals of the tournament. The finals took place as part of the 2013 Homenaje a Dos Leyendas show and saw La Sombra and Volador Jr. win the match and the tournament. Following the loss a frustrated Atlantis attacked Último Guerrero and tore his mask apart. Atlantis subsequently made a Luchas de Apuestas challenge to Último Guerrero that was not immediately accepted. The two rivals officially signed the contrat for the mask vs. mask match on March 21, but did not announce an actual date for the match. At the same press conference it was announced that CMLL would commemorate Atlantis' 30 year anniversary as a wrestler with a special Super Viernes show on May 3. Atlantis was teamed up with Hombre Bala Jr. for the 2013 Gran Alternativa, the son of Hombre Bala that Atlantis unmasked in 1986. The team competed in Block A of the tournament on April 12, 2013. The duo defeated Akuma and Mephisto in the first round, Taurus and Averno in the second round and Guerrero Negro Jr. and Último Guerrero in the semi-finals to earn a spot in the finals. The finals took place on April 26, 2013 during the Arena Mexico 57th Anniversary Show and saw Boby Zavala and Rey Escorpión defeat Hombre Bala Jr. and Atlantis, two falls to one to win the 2013 Gran Alternativa tournament.

During the celebration of Atlantis' 30th anniversary as a wrestler Guerrero appeared after a match to berate Atlantis, which turned out to be a distraction for the real Último Guerrero to attack Atlantis from behind. The two identically dressed Guerreros proceeded to beat up Atlantis and tear his mask apart. Following the match Último Guerrero introduced his brother "Gran Guerrero". The much anticipated and hyped Mask vs. Mask match between Atlantis and Último Guerrero at the 80th Anniversary Show on September 13 never came to fruition as the two were defeated in a Relevos Suicidas match by La Sombra and Volador Jr., who instead advanced to the Lucha de Apuestas against each other. On March 21, 2014, Atlantis won the Torneo Nacional de Parejas Increibles for the fourth time, this time teaming with Euforia. On June 20, Atlantis won the 2014 Leyenda de Azul, scoring the last elimination over Último Guerrero. Atlantis defeated arch rival Último Guerrero in a Luchas de Apuestas match, in the main event of the CMLL 81st Anniversary Show. After the match Guerrero was forced to unmask as per the stipulation. In January 2015, Atlantis returned to Japan to take part in the Fantastica Mania 2015 tour, during which he and Máscara Dorada won the Fantastica Mania 2015 Tag Tournament. On April 26, 2015, Los Reyes de la Atlantida won the Mexican National Trios Championship for a record-breaking third time by defeating La Peste Negra (El Felino, Mr. Niebla and Negro Casas). On August 9, 2015 Los Reyes de la Atlantida lost the Mexican National Trios Championship to Los Hijos del Infierno ("The Sons of the Inferno"; Ephesto, Mephisto and Lucifierno), ending their third reign as champions. 15 days later, on August 24, Atlantis defeated Mephisto to win the Mexican National Light Heavyweight Championship.

Over the summer of 2015 Los Ingobernables started to wrestle against tecnico teams instead of generally facing rudo teams as they had been up to that point. In August 2015 Los Ingobernables found themselves facing off against Atlantis on multiple occasions, often with La Sombra going out of his way to attack Atlantis, tearing Atlantis' mask apart during matches to show his disdain for the veteran tecnico. On August 19, 2015 CMLL held a press conference where they announced that the winner of the main event of the 80th Anniversary, La Sombra, would put his mask on the line against the winner of the main event of the 81st Anniversary Show, Atlantis, in the main event of CMLL's 82nd Anniversary Show on September 18, 2015. The match saw Atlantis defeat La Sombra, two falls to one, forcing La Sombra to unmask. Since he was the reigning Mexican National Light Heavyweight Championship Atlantis participated in the 2015 Universal Championship tournament, which he won, defeating Último Guerrero in the finals on October 16.

On January 1, 2016 CMLL held a major show called Sin Piedad ("No Mercy") where Atlantis teamed up with Marco Corleone, and Valiente, losing to Los Revolucionarios del Terror (Dragón Rojo Jr., Pólvora, and Thunder). He also participated in the Fantastica Mania 2016 tour of Japan, where most nights he was part of the losing side against Los Ingobernables de Japón (Tetsuya Naito, Bushi and Evil).

Championships and accomplishments
Empresa Mexicana de Lucha Libre / Consejo Mundial de Lucha Libre
CMLL World Light Heavyweight Championship (2 times)
CMLL World Tag Team Championship (5 times) – with Rayo de Jalisco Jr. (1), Lizmark (1), Blue Panther (1), Último Guerrero (1), and Diamante Azul (1)
CMLL World Trios Championship (4 times) – with Mr. Niebla and Lizmark (1), Mr. Niebla and Black Warrior (1), and Último Guerrero and Tarzan Boy (1), Último Guerrero and Negro Casas
Mexican National Light Heavyweight Championship (1 time)
Mexican National Middleweight Championship (1 time)
Mexican National Tag Team Championship (1 time) – with Ángel Azteca
Mexican National Trios Championship (4 times) – with Octagón and Máscara Sagrada (1) and Delta and Guerrero Maya Jr. (3)
NWA World Light Heavyweight Championship (1 time)
NWA World Middleweight Championship (3 times)
Torneo Gran Alternativa (2005) – with La Máscara
Copa Bobby Bonales (2011)
Copa Victoria (1997)
Forjando un Ídolo: Guerra Continúa (2011) – with Delta and Guerrero Maya Jr.
International Gran Prix (2005)
Leyenda de Azul (2014)
Leyenda de Plata (2005)
CMLL Torneo Nacional de Parejas Increibles (2010, 2011, 2012, 2014) – with Máscara Dorada (2010, 2011), Mr. Niebla (2012) and Euforia (2014)
Torneo Increibles de Parejas, Arena Puebla – with Volador Jr.
Universal Championship (2015)
CMLL Tag Team of the Year (2010) – with Último Guerrero
Lucha Libre Azteca
LLA Azteca Championship (1 time)
Michinoku Pro Wrestling
Tohoku Junior Heavyweight Championship (1 time)
Fukumen World League (2003)
New Japan Pro-Wrestling
Fantastica Mania 2015 Tag Tournament – with Máscara Dorada
Pro Wrestling Illustrated
PWI ranked him #34 of the top 500 singles wrestlers in the PWI 500 in 2006
PWI ranked him #225 of the top 500 singles wrestlers of the PWI Years in 2003
Universal Wrestling Entertainment
UWE Tag Team Championship (1 time) – with Último Guerrero
World Wrestling Association
WWA Light Heavyweight Championship (1 time, current)
Wrestling Observer Newsletter
Match of the Year: 2000 (Atlantis vs. Villano III in Mexico City on March 17)
Wrestling Observer Newsletter Hall of Fame (Class of 2013)

Luchas de Apuestas record

Filmography
La Fuerza Bruta ("The Brute Power") – 1991
Octagón y Atlantis, la revancha ("Octagón and Atlantis, the revenge") – 1992
Atlantis al rescate ("Atlantis to the rescue") – 2007

Footnotes

References

General sources – Career

General sources – Luchas de Apuestas
 
Specific

External links

 
 Online World of Wrestling profile

1962 births
20th-century professional wrestlers
21st-century professional wrestlers
Living people
Male actors from Jalisco
Masked wrestlers
Mexican male film actors
Mexican male professional wrestlers
Unidentified wrestlers
Professional wrestlers from Jalisco
Mexican National Middleweight Champions
CMLL World Light Heavyweight Champions
CMLL World Tag Team Champions
CMLL World Trios Champions
NWA World Light Heavyweight Champions
NWA World Middleweight Champions
Tohoku Junior Heavyweight Champions
Mexican National Light Heavyweight Champions